Dame Emma Natasha Walmsley  (born June 1969) is the chief executive officer (CEO) of GlaxoSmithKline.  She succeeded Sir Andrew Witty, who retired in March 2017. Before GSK, she worked for L'Oréal for 17 years, and was a non-executive director of Diageo until September 2016. She grew up in Barrow-in-Furness, Cumbria, England.

Early life
Walmsley was born in June 1969 in Barrow-in-Furness in Lancashire (now Cumbria), the daughter of Vice-Admiral Sir Robert Walmsley and Lady (Christina V.) Walmsley ( Melvill). She boarded at St Swithun's School, Winchester, and has an MA in Classics and Modern Languages from Oxford University, where she studied at Christ Church.

Career
Walmsley worked at L'Oréal for 17 years where she held a variety of general management and marketing roles in Paris, London and New York. From 2007 she was based in Shanghai as General Manager, Consumer Products for L'Oreal China, where she ran the company's Chinese consumer products business, overseeing global brands including L'Oréal Paris, Maybelline and Garnier, as well as Mininurse, a Chinese skincare brand. At the time of her move to GSK in 2010, Advertising Age quoted company insiders surprised at her departure from L'Oreal, where she had been tipped for a senior global management role.

She joined GlaxoSmithKline in May 2010 as President of Consumer Healthcare Europe, rising in October 2011 to head its global consumer healthcare division as President of Consumer Healthcare Worldwide and a member of the executive team. In March 2015 she became the chief executive officer of Consumer Healthcare. Walmsley was particularly involved in leading the company's sales drive in emerging markets. Under her leadership the consumer products division, one of the world's largest consumer health groups with brands including Panadol, Voltaren and Horlicks, made up nearly a quarter of GlaxoSmithKline's revenues.

She took over as CEO of the company in April 2017, making her the first woman to run a major pharmaceutical company. At the time, analysts commented that Walmsley's appointment could be seen as a signal that GSK would keep its consumer operation as a core part of its business.

In August 2017, Walmsley stated that her priority was for GlaxoSmithKline to become more adept at developing and commercialising new drugs. She announced a narrowed set of priorities for drug development, setting a target of allocating 80% of pharma R&D capital to a maximum of four disease areas. However, industry analysts noted that GlaxoSmithKline's decisions to hold its dividend would restrict the amount of cash available for R&D and acquiring intellectual property from other companies.

Walmsley has made changes, including "the transformation of the leadership team within R&D."

In January 2018, it was reported that Walmsley had replaced 50 of GlaxoSmithKline's top managers across the company's businesses, and created a number of new roles, including hiring Karenann Terrell from Walmart as chief digital and technology officer.

Walmsley was appointed Dame Commander of the Order of the British Empire (DBE) in the 2020 Birthday Honours for services to the pharmaceutical industry and business.

Leadership style

A Financial Times profile of Walmsley in September 2016 reported that colleagues describe her as a "strong and dynamic" leader who mixes a personable style with a "steely" focus. "She sets clear objectives and there's lots of KPIs [key performance indicators] to measure delivery," said one. She pays close attention to talent development but "can be ruthless with underperformers".

Other roles
Walmsley is a member of the GlaxoSmithKline board. She was a non-executive director of Diageo from January to September 2016. In September 2019, Walmsley joined the Microsoft board as an independent director.

Personal life
Outside work, Walmsley enjoys yoga. She married David Owen in September 1995 in Greenwich, London, and they have four children.

Honours
In 2019 Walmsley ranked 2nd in Fortune Magazine's list of the 'Most Powerful International Women' in business, having topped the list in 2018. In 2017 she was placed second on the same list.

References

English chief executives
1969 births
British women chief executives
Dames Commander of the Order of the British Empire
GSK plc people
People from Barrow-in-Furness
Living people
Microsoft people
Walmsley family
Chief executives in the pharmaceutical industry
Alumni of Christ Church, Oxford